Gregory Blaxland (17 June 1778 – 1 January 1853) was an English pioneer farmer and explorer in Australia, noted especially for initiating and co-leading the first successful crossing of the Blue Mountains by European settlers.

Early life 

Gregory Blaxland was born 17 June 1778 at Fordwich, Kent, England, the fourth son of John Blaxland, mayor from 1767 to 1774, whose family had owned estates nearby for generations, and Mary, daughter of Captain Parker, R.N. Gregory attended The King's School, Canterbury. In July 1799 in the church of St George the Martyr there, he married 20-year-old Elizabeth, daughter of John Spurdon; they had five sons and two daughters.

The Blaxlands were friends of Sir Joseph Banks who appears to have strongly influenced the decision of Gregory and his eldest brother, John, to emigrate to Australia. The government promised them land, convict servants and free passages, in accord with its policy of encouraging 'settlers of responsibility and capital'. Leaving John to sell their Kent estates, Gregory sailed in the William Pitt on 1 September 1805 with his wife, the three children they then had, two servants, an overseer, a few sheep, seed, bees, tools, groceries and clothing.

Soon afterwards he also bought  at the Brush Farm (near Eastwood) from D'Arcy Wentworth for £1500, while also displaying some of his future characteristics by commencing litigation against the master of the William Pitt.

Blue Mountains expedition 

Early in 1813 Blaxland, who needed more grazing land, obtained the approval of Governor Lachlan Macquarie for an attempt to cross the Great Dividing Range, known as the Blue Mountains, following the mountain ridges, instead of following the rivers and valleys. He secured the participation of William Lawson and William Charles Wentworth in the expedition, which was successful (though the expedition stopped short of actually crossing over the mountains) and enabled the settlers to access and use the land west of the mountains for farming. The crossing took 21 days, and only 6 days to return.

In February 1823 Blaxland published his Journal of a Tour of Discovery Across the Blue Mountains (London, 1823) in which he wrote:
"On Tuesday, May 11, 1813, Mr. Gregory Blaxland, Mr. William Wentworth, and Lieutenant Lawson, attended by four servants, with five dogs, and four horses laden with provisions, ammunition, and other necessaries, left Mr. Blaxland's farm at the South Creek, for the purpose of endeavouring to effect a passage over the Blue Mountains ..."

In recognition of the successful crossing, all three explorers were granted by Macquarie  of land west of the mountains.

Other activities
Blaxland is also noted as one of the first settlers to plant grapes for wine-making purposes. He was engaged during the next few years in wine-making. He had brought vines from the Cape of Good Hope and found a species resistant to blight.

Blaxland's diaries show that he had a clear grasp of the scale upon which agricultural and pastoral activities would be profitable in Australia. In 1814, like many others almost insolvent because of drought and depression, he tried to persuade Governor Macquarie to sanction a scheme for the exploitation of the interior by a large agricultural company similar to the later Australian Agricultural Company of the 1820s. Macquarie would not agree nor would he allow Blaxland land in the interior for his own flocks. Blaxland then had to dispose of his livestock, and joined the colonial opposition to Macquarie, and in 1819 sharply criticized his administration to Commissioner John Thomas Bigge.

Blaxland visited England in 1822 taking with him a sample of his wine. While in England he published in February 1823 his Journal of a Tour of Discovery Across the Blue Mountains. Later the same year, Blaxland was awarded the silver medal of the Royal Society of Arts for the wine he had brought to London.

Later years 
His wife died in December 1826. In January 1827 Blaxland was elected by a public meeting with two others to present a petition to Governor Darling asking that "Trial by jury" and "Taxation by Representation" should be extended to the colony. Still opposed to the governor's authority, he made another visit to England, taking a petition in support of trial by jury and some form of representative government, and again carried samples of his wine, for which he won a gold medal of the Royal Society of Arts in 1828.

He successfully petitioned the Colonial Office for a drawback on the import duty on brandy imported into the colony and 'actually used in the manufacture of wine'. Always a man of moody and mercurial character, Blaxland devoted his colonial activities almost entirely to the pursuit of his agricultural and viticultural interests.

He suffered great personal loss with the early and untimely deaths of his second son, youngest son and wife along with others quite close to him in rapid succession, which bore very heavily on his heart. He committed suicide on 1 January 1853 in New South Wales and was buried in All Saints Cemetery in Parramatta.

His son John was a prominent businessman. He was appointed to the New South Wales Legislative Council and served there from 1863 until his death in 1884.

Publications
 A Journal of a Tour of Discovery Across the Blue Mountains, 1823
 Wine from New South Wales, 1828

Recognition 

 The township of Blaxland in the Blue Mountains is named after him, as is the Australian Electoral Division of Blaxland.
 Blaxland Creek runs near his land grant in western Sydney.
 Gregory, Blaxland, Lawson and Wentworth Avenues are found in the Melbourne suburb of Frankston where the Blaxland Avenue Reserve runs through.
 Blaxland Road
 Eastwood
 Wentworth Falls

In 1963 he was honoured, together with Lawson and Wentworth, on a postage stamp issued by Australia Post depicting the Blue Mountains crossing.

See also 
 Land exploration of Australia
 List of Blue Mountains articles

References

External links 

 

English explorers
Explorers of Australia
English emigrants to colonial Australia
Suicides in New South Wales
People from the Blue Mountains (New South Wales)
Burials in New South Wales
1778 births
1853 deaths
History of the Blue Mountains (New South Wales)
Eastwood, New South Wales
1850s suicides